Karen Yu (born January 18, 1992) is an American professional wrestler. She is currently signed to the promotion WWE, where she performs on the NXT brand under the ring name Wendy Choo. She is also known for her appearances with Ring of Honor and on the independent circuit as Karen Q and for her appearances with WWE as Mei Ying.

Early life 
Yu grew up in the Bayside, Queens neighborhood of New York City, attending Benjamin N. Cardozo High School. Yu participated in gymnastics from the age of five. She received an NCAA Division II scholarship for volleyball, earning a bachelor's degree in physical education from Queens College and a master's degree in teaching from Lehman College. Before becoming a full-time professional wrestler, she taught physical education at Fiorello H. LaGuardia High School and coached gymnastics at Benjamin N. Cardozo High School.

Professional wrestling career 
Yu was first trained to wrestle by Johnny Rodz at Gleason's Gym in Brooklyn, then by Damian Adams at the Team Adams Pro Wrestling Academy in Wharton, New Jersey. She debuted in 2014 under her birth name, appearing with the Centereach, New York-based Victory Pro Wrestling (VPW) promotion. Over the following years, she competed on the independent circuit, primarily in the Northeastern United States. In 2016, she adopted the ring name "Karen Q". She won her first title in April 2016, defeating Nikki Addams for the VPW Women's Championship. In 2017, she won the East Coast Wrestling Association Women's Championship. She took part in the ECWA Super 8 ChickFight Tournament in 2016 and 2017, losing to Deonna Purrazzo in the finals in 2016 and winning the tournament in 2017.

In April 2017, Yu began appearing with Ring of Honor. At Survival of the Fittest in November 2017, she lost to Deonna Purrazzo in a no disqualification match. At Final Battle in December 2018, Yu took part in a four way match for the ROH Women of Honor World Championship that was won by Kelly Klein, marking her first pay-per-view appearance.

Yu made her first appearance with WWE in August 2018, competing in the Mae Young Classic tournament under the ring name "Karen Q". In February 2019, she signed a contract with WWE and was assigned to the WWE Performance Center in Orlando, Florida for further training. From February to July 2019, she wrestled for WWE as "Karen Q", primarily teaming with Xia Li on NXT house shows. In July 2019, Yu suffered a fractured lateral malleolus; she spent the next two years rehabilitating, undergoing two surgeries. In December 2020, Yu was reintroduced on NXT as "Mei Ying", the leader of the stable "Tian Sha" alongside Xia Li and Boa. She returned to the ring in August 2021. In November 2021, the Mei Ying character was dropped and Yu was again repackaged, this time as "Wendy Choo". In March 2022, Choo and Dakota Kai competed in the Dusty Rhodes Tag Team Classic, losing to Io Shirai and Kay Lee Ray in the finals. In June 2022 at In Your House, Choo unsuccessfully challenged Mandy Rose for the NXT Women's Championship.

Professional wrestling style and persona 
Choo wrestles in a "technical" style with a mix of "technical wizardry and breathtaking aerial assaults". Her finishing moves have included a modified Boston crab (dubbed the Spring Roll) and a fujiwara armbar. She utilizes "an array of stunning suplexes".

In 2020 and 2021, Yu portrayed the "enigmatic and destructive" character of "Mei Ying", a 1,000 year old woman who acted as a "Yoda" for the Tian Sha stable. In 2022, she adopted the gimmick of "Wendy Choo", a constantly tired wrestler who performs in a onesie.

Personal life 
Yu is a Chinese American.

Championships and accomplishments 
East Coast Wrestling Association
ECWA Women's Championship (1 time)
Victory Pro Wrestling
VPW Women's Championship (1 time)

References

External links 
 
 
 
 

1992 births
21st-century professional wrestlers
American female professional wrestlers
American people of Chinese descent
American gymnastics coaches
American gymnasts
Lehman College alumni
Living people
People from Bayside, Queens
Professional wrestlers from New York (state)
Professional wrestlers from New York City
Queens College, City University of New York alumni
Schoolteachers from New York (state)